Rhabdops is a genus of snakes in the subfamily Natricinae of the family Colubridae. The genus is endemic to the Western Ghats of India.

Species
The genus Rhabdops contains two recognized valid species:
Rhabdops aquaticus  – aquatic rhabdops, water rhabdops
Rhabdops olivaceus  – olive forest snake, olive trapezoid snake

The species R. bicolor was removed from Rhabdops in 2019, and placed in the newly erected genus Smithophis.

Nota bene: A binomial authority in parentheses indicates that the species was originally described in a genus other than Rhabdops.

References

Further reading
Boulenger GA (1893). Catalogue of the Snakes in the British Museum (Natural History). Volume I., Containing the Families ... Colubridæ Aglyphæ, part. London: Trustees of the British Museum (Natural History). (Taylor and Francis, printers). xiii + 448 pp. + Plates I-XXVIII. (Rhabdops, new genus, p. 300).
Smith MA (1943). The Fauna of British India, Ceylon and Burma, Including the Whole of the Indo-Chinese Sub-region. Reptilia and Amphibia. Vol. III.—Serpentes. London: Secretary of State for India. (Taylor and Francis, printers). xii + 583 pp. (Genus Rhabdops, pp. 327–328).

 
Snake genera
Taxa named by George Albert Boulenger